HMS Cambrian was one of eight  destroyers built for the Royal Navy during the Second World War. commissioned in mid-1944, she was assigned to the Home Fleet and escorted two Arctic convoys as well as larger elements of the fleet during operations off the German-occupied Norwegian coast.

Design and description
The Ca-class destroyer was a repeat of the preceding .

The ships were powered by a pair of geared steam turbines, each driving one propeller shaft using steam provided by two Admiralty three-drum boilers. Their complement consisted of 186 officers and ratings.

The main armament of the destroyers consisted of four QF  Mk IV dual-purpose guns, one superfiring pair each fore and aft of the superstructure protected by partial gun shields. Their anti-aircraft suite consisted of one twin-gun stabilised Mk IV "Hazemeyer" mount for  Bofors guns amidships and two twin and a pair of single mounts for six  Oerlikon AA guns. The ships were also fitted with two quadruple mounts amidships for 21-inch (533 mm) torpedo tubes. For anti-submarine work, they were equipped with a pair of depth charge rails and four throwers for 108 depth charges.

Construction and career
Cambrian was laid down by Scotts Shipbuilding & Engineering at their shipyard in Greenock on 14 August 1942 with the name of Spitfire and was launched on 10 December 1943 by which time she had been renamed. She was commissioned on 17 July and was allocated to the 6th Destroyer Flotilla for service with the Home Fleet. After a refit in mid-1945 to augment her anti-aircraft armament, she was transferred for service in the Far East in June, but joined the East Indies Fleet at Trincomalee, British Ceylon, in August.

Post war service
Following the war Cambrian paid off into reserve.  Along with other Ca group destroyers, she was selected for modernisation in 1963. Work included a new enclosed bridge and Mark 6M gunnery fire control system, as well as the addition of two triple Squid anti-submarine mortars.

In January 1964 Cambrian saw operational service off the coast of East Africa, as part of the operation to quell the mutiny by the Tanganyika Rifles. The destroyer operated as part of a force, along with the aircraft carrier , which landed Royal Marines from 45 Commando. Cambrian used her three 4.5-inch guns to provide naval gunfire support.

During January 1968, Cambrian, who had been on duties near Mauritius in preparation for the islands upcoming independence was diverted to the outlying island of Rodrigues to quell a reported uprising by some of the populace. The so-called uprising consisted of a number of individuals who had been arrested by the local authorities for looting a government food storage warehouse and appropriating a supply of sweet potatoes following a devastating hurricane on Christmas Eve 1967 that had left them homeless and penniless. At this point it is believed that the authorities requested assistance which was provided by the destroyer. On her early morning arrival the ships 4.5" guns were fired (With blanks it is believed) and an armed landing party was provided. The landing party patrolled with the local police for several weeks to help restore order again.

Cambrian was paid off in December 1968. She was sold for scrap to Thos. W. Ward in August 1971 and arrived at their breaker's yard at Briton Ferry on 3 September.

References

Bibliography

External links
 HMS Cambrian Association website

 

World War II destroyers of the United Kingdom
Cold War destroyers of the United Kingdom
1943 ships
Ships built on the River Clyde
C-class destroyers (1943) of the Royal Navy